Dyne is a name. Notable people with the name include:

 John Dyne (disambiguation), multiple people
 John Dyne (MP for Hythe)(?-1412/13), an English politician
 John Dyne (MP for East Grinstead)(fl. 1383–1414), an English politician.
 John Bradley Dyne (?-?), headmaster of Highgate School from 1838–1874
 Dyne Fenton Smith (1890–1969), English rugby union player

See also
 Dyne, a unit of force
 Van Dyne (disambiguation)
 Dine (disambiguation)
 Dyn (disambiguation)
 Dynes, surname